Eyyübiye is a district in Şanlıurfa Province in Turkey created in 2014 from the central district of the province.

Background 

According to Law act no 6360, all Turkish provinces with a population more than 750 000, will be a metropolitan municipality and the districts within the metropolitan municipalities will be second level municipalities. The law also created new districts within the provinces in addition to present districts. These changes became effective by the local elections in 2014. In the local elections of 31 March 2019, Mehmet Kuş (AKP) was elected mayor. Adem Ünal is the appointed district governor.

Composition 
A 2018 survey on first language conducted by the municipality showed that 56.8% of the district spoke Kurdish as their first language, followed by Arabic at 38.9% and Turkish at 4.3%.

Population

See also 

 Çamurlu, Şanlıurfa
 Hancıgaz

References

Districts of Şanlıurfa Province
Şanlıurfa